The 2016–17 AFA Senior Male League is the eighteenth season of the AFA Senior Male League, the only football league in Anguilla. The season began on 15 October 2016.

The league was won by Roaring Lions.

Teams

Nine teams began the season.  Kicks United and Roaring Lions returned to the league after withdrawing last season. Police and Uprising were added to the league.

Standings
Final table not available. Reported table:

References

External links
League table at rsssf.com

AFA Senior Male League seasons
2016–17 in Caribbean football leagues
2016–17 domestic association football leagues